Anthony Nwaigwe is a former professional footballer from Nigeria who played as striker. He was a member of the Iwuanyanwu Nationale team whose plane, Oriental Airline BAC I-U crashed in 1994, while conveying them back home after the Champions Cup outing in Tunis.

Professional Football Career

Nwaigwe joined ACB Lagos in 1989 and moved to Iwuanyanwu Nationale in 1990 before joining Enugu Rangers in 1995. He started his international football career with Africa Sports National  in 1996 from where he moved to Al-Ahli Dubai in 1998. He played for F.C. Denderleeuw E.H. in Belgium (now F.C. Verbroedering Dender Eendracht Hekelgem) also simply known as Dender or Verbroedering Dender between 2001 and 2002. He played for the Super Eagles under Coach Clemens Westerhof and made twelve (12) appearances. He also played a 1994 World Cup qualifying match.

Club Awards

Won the Silver Ware in the WAFU Cup with Enugu Rangers: 1996

Won the Nigerian Premier League with Iwuanyanwu Nationale : 1993

Semi-finalist, CAF Champions League with Iwuanyanwu Nationale : 1991

Individual awards

Highest Goal Scorer, Nigerian Premier League: 1991, 1993 and 1995

Pepsi Cola Award, Player of the month of August, Nigeria Premier League: 1995

Aderokun Award, Highest Goal Scorer, Nigerian Premier League: 1993

White Horse Award: Player of the month of September, Nigeria Premier League: 1993

Bournvita Award, Highest Goal Scorer, Nigerian Premier League: 1991

Affiliations

Member, London Football Association

Member, London Football Coaches Association

Member, Nigeria Football Players Association

References

External links 
  Nigeria - Details of World Cup Matches
  Enugu Rangers - Football Nigeria
  The Nigerian League’s Top Scorers’ Jinx
 F.C. Verbroedering Dender Eendracht Hekelgem#Notable former players F.C. Verbroedering Dender Eendracht Hekelgem
 K.F.C. Denderleeuw Eendracht Hekelgem K.F.C. Denderleeuw Eendracht Hekelgem

Living people
Nigerian footballers
ACB Lagos F.C. players
Association football forwards
Year of birth missing (living people)